JSC Rostvertol is a Russian helicopter manufacturer company located in Rostov-on-Don. It was founded on 1 July 1939. Rostvertol has been producing helicopters designed by the Mil design bureau since 1956 and is a world leader in the manufacture of heavy-lift helicopters.

It built the Mi-6 Hook and Mi-10 Harke heavy-lift helicopters and the Mi-26 Halo. It also produced the Mi-25 and Mi-35 Hind combat attack helicopters and the Mi-28 Havoc. It produces Mi-26T, Mi-24 and Mi-28N.

The plant also produces substantial quantities of helicopter rotor blades and consumer goods.

Ownership 
The capital structure of the company is as follows:
 75.06% Russian Helicopters.
 6.59% private stockholders
  2.35% Rosimushchestvo.

References

External links 
 The company's website
 

Russian Helicopters
Helicopter manufacturers of the Soviet Union
Companies based in Rostov-on-Don
Companies formerly listed on the Moscow Exchange
1939 establishments in the Soviet Union
Golden Idea national award winners
Russian brands